Patricia Champion Frist (September 28, 1939 – January 5, 2021)  was an American businesswoman and philanthropist from Tennessee.

Early life
Patricia Champion Frist was born as Patricia Champion in Ridgely, Tennessee in 1939. She was the daughter of Ogden (Harrington) and Garland Ryals Champion.

Career
Frist served as the President of Frist Capital, an investment firm. She served on the Board of Directors of SunTrust Bank from 2000 to 2010.

Philanthropy
She served on the board of trustees of the Frist Foundation. Additionally, she served on the boards of directors of the Friends of Warner Park. She also served as an honorary trustee of the Harpeth Hall School.

The Patricia Champion Frist Hall on the campus of Vanderbilt University in Nashville was renamed in her honor in 1998; it houses the School of Nursing.

Political activity
She was a large donor to the Republican Party. In 1997, she donated US$100,000 to the Republican National Committee.

Personal life
She was married to Thomas F. Frist, Jr., a billionaire who co-founded the Hospital Corporation of America. They resided in Belle Meade, Tennessee. They had two sons, Thomas F. Frist, III and William R. Frist, and a daughter, Patricia Frist Elcan, who is married to investor Charles A. Elcan.

References

1939 births
2021 deaths
People from Belle Meade, Tennessee
People from Lake County, Tennessee
Businesspeople from Tennessee
American corporate directors
American bankers
Philanthropists from Tennessee
Vanderbilt University people
SunTrust Banks people
Tennessee Republicans
Frist family